Sancho III may refer to:

King Sancho III of Navarre (c. 985 – 1035)
King Sancho III of Castile (1134–1158)
Sancho III of Gascony